Whitney Bogart née Burk (born 21 April 1986) is a Canadian goalball player who competes in international level events.

She is the sister in law of goalball teammate Amy Burk who married Whitney's twin brother, Tyler.

References

External links
 
 

1986 births
Living people
People with albinism
Sportspeople from Thunder Bay
Paralympic goalball players of Canada
Goalball players at the 2012 Summer Paralympics
Goalball players at the 2016 Summer Paralympics
Medalists at the 2011 Parapan American Games
Medalists at the 2015 Parapan American Games
Medalists at the 2019 Parapan American Games
Goalball players at the 2020 Summer Paralympics